William Wiley may refer to:

 William Wiley (sailor), 19th American sailor
 William D. Wiley (born 1971), American politician, Virginia Delegate 
 William H. Wiley (1842–1945), U.S. Representative from New Jersey
 William T. Wiley (1937–2021), American contemporary artist

See also 
 William Wyllie (disambiguation)